The discography of the Scottish new wave/jangle pop band Orange Juice consists of three studio albums, one mini-album, two limited release live albums, seven compilations, one box set, one video album, and fifteen singles (including an unreleased "Wan Light" single and a re-release of "Blue Boy").

Albums

Studio albums

Mini albums

Live albums

Compilation albums

Box sets

Video albums

Singles

References

Discographies of British artists
Rock music group discographies
Pop music group discographies
New wave discographies